The demographics of Benin include population density, ethnicity, education level, health of the populace, economic status, religious affiliations and other aspects of the population.

The majority of Benin's 13.3 million people live in the south. The population is young, with a life expectancy of 62 years.

About 42 African ethnic groups live in this country; these various groups settled in Benin at different times and have also migrated within the country. Ethnic groups include:
the Yoruba in the southeast (migrated from what is now Nigeria in the 12th century);
the Dendi in the north-central area (they came from what is now Mali in the 16th century);
the Bariba and the Fula (or Fulani) in the northeast;
the Betammaribe and the Somba in the Atacora Range;
the Fon in the area around Abomey in the South Central; and
the Mina, Xweda, and Aja (who came from what is now Togo in the 12th century) on the coast.

French is the official language but is spoken more in urban than in rural areas. The literacy rate is 54% among adult males and 31% among adult females as of 2018; these rates are slowly growing. Recent migrations have brought other African nationals to Benin, including Nigerians, Togolese and Malians. The foreign community also includes many Lebanese and Indians involved in trade and commerce. The personnel of the many European embassies, foreign aid missions, nongovernmental organizations and missionary groups account for much of the 5,500 European population.

Several religions are practiced in Benin. Traditional African religions are widespread (50%), and their practices vary from one ethnic group to the other. Arab merchants introduced Islam in the north and among the Yoruba. European missionaries brought Christianity to the south and central areas of Benin. Muslims account for 20% of the population and Christians for 30%. Many nominal Muslims and Christians continue to practice traditional African religion traditions. It is believed that West African Vodun originated in Benin and was introduced to Brazil and the Caribbean Islands by slaves taken from this particular area of the Slave Coast.

Population

The proportion of children below the age of 15 in 2010 was 43.7%; 53.3% were between 15 and 65 years of age, while 3% were of 65 years or older.

Population Estimates by Sex and Age Group (01.VII.2011): 

Population Estimates by Sex and Age Group (01.VII.2019):

Vital statistics
Benin's registration of vital events is incomplete. The Population Department of the United Nations has prepared the following estimates. Population estimates account for under numeration in population censuses.

Source: UN DESA, World Population Prospects, 2022

Fertility and births
Total Fertility Rate (TFR) (Wanted Fertility Rate) and Crude Birth Rate (CBR):

Fertility data as of 2011-2012 (DHS Program):

Life expectancy

Ethnic groups 
There are several dozen ethnolinguistic groups in Benin, representing three of Africa's language families: Niger–Congo, Nilo-Saharan, and Afroasiatic. The latter is represented by Hausa living mostly as merchants in the north, while Nilo-Saharan is represented by the Dɛndi, descending from the Songhai Empire. The Dɛndi language predominates along the Niger River in the far north, and is used as a lingua franca in Muslim areas throughout the north, in Alibori, Borgou, and Donga provinces. Of the Niger–Congo family, five branches are represented:

 Mande by the Boko or Busa, now in the far eastern corner (southern Alibori-northern Borgou), but previously more widely spread before being largely absorbed by the Bariba
 Senegambian by the nomadic Fulani scattered across the northeast
 Benue–Congo by the Yoruba such as those of the old kingdom of Sakete, and the capital city of Porto-Novo, having expanded west from the Yoruba cities of Oyo and Ife in the 12th to 19th centuries
 Gur (Voltaic) languages predominate in the four northern provinces, with the Batɔmbu (Bariba) of the old Borgou (Bariba) Kingdom occupying most of the countryside in its successor provinces of Borgou and Alibori, as well as the provincial capital of Parakou; the Yom throughout much of Donga province and its capital Djougou; and several groups in the Atakora, including the Bɛtamaribɛ of the Otammari country around the provincial capital of Natitingou, the Biali, the Waama of Tanguiéta, and the Gulmàceba.
 Kwa, especially the Gbe languages spoken by the Tado peoples in the southern and central provinces: the Aja who established themselves in Kouffo province from neighboring Togo and gave rise to the other Tado peoples of Benin, except for the Mina of Mono province, who arrived separately from Togo or Ghana: The Fɔn culture centered in Zou province around the old Fɔn capital of Abomey, but also dominant in Cotonou and southern Atlantique areas such as Ouidah; the Maxi in central Collines, especially around Savalou; the Ayizɔ of central Atlantique (Allada); the Xwla and Xueda in the lagoons of the coast; the Tɔfin of Ouémé; and the Gun. Other Kwa languages are spoken by the Anii in southern Donga in the region of Bassila, and the Fooɖo in western Donga near the town of Ouaké.

The largest ethnic group are the Fon, with 1.7 million speakers of the Fon language (2001), followed by the various Yoruba groups (1.2 million), the Aja (600,000), the Bariba (460,000), the Ayizo (330,000), the Fulani (310,000), and the Gun (240,000). Near the ports in the south can be found many people who are descended from returned Brazilian slaves. There are also small numbers of Europeans, principally French, and people from the western Asia, mainly Lebanese, and East Asia, chiefly Indians.

White Beninese
White Beninese people are people who are of French, Portuguese, Dutch, British,  Italian, German, Latin American, Russian, and Scandinavian descent. 
Notable Europeans include:
 Fabienne Feraez, athlete.
 Francisco Félix de Sousa, slave trader.
 Daria Strokous, actress.

Other demographic statistics 

Demographic statistics according to the World Population Review in 2021.

One birth every 1 minutes	
One death every 5 minutes	
One net migrant every 288 minutes	
Net gain of one person every 2 minutes

The following demographic statistics are from the CIA World Factbook, unless otherwise indicated.

Population
13,754,688 (2022 est.)
11,340,504 (July 2018 est.)
Note: estimates for this country explicitly take into account the effects of excess mortality due to AIDS; this can result in lower life expectancy, higher infant mortality and death rates, lower population and growth rates, and changes in the distribution of population by age and sex than would otherwise be expected. (July 2017 est.)

Religions
Muslim 27.7%, Roman Catholic 25.5%, Protestant 13.5% (Celestial 6.7%, Methodist 3.4%, other Protestant 3.4%), Vodoun 11.6%, other Christian 9.5%, other traditional religions 2.6%, other 2.6%, none 5.8% (2013 est.)

Age structure
0-14 years: 45.56% (male 2,955,396/female 2,906,079)
15-24 years: 20.36% (male 1,300,453/female 1,318,880)
25-54 years: 28.54% (male 1,735,229/female 1,935,839)
55-64 years: 3.15% (male 193,548/female 211,427)
65 years and over: 2.39% (male 140,513/female 167,270) (2020 est.)

0-14 years: 42.26% (male 2,445,265 / female 2,347,091)
15-24 years: 20.53% (male 1,184,977 / female 1,143,605)
25-54 years: 30.66% (male 1,759,834 / female 1,717,467)
55-64 years: 3.65% (male 184,453 / female 229,945)
65 years and over: 2.89% (male 128,920 / female 198,947) (2018 est.)

0-14 years: 44.7% (male 2,126,973 / female 2,042,340)
15-64 years: 52.6% (male 2,443,370 / female 2,461,421)
65 years and over: 2.7% (male 101,640 / female 149,288) (2011 est.)

Total fertility rate
5.43 children born/woman (2022 est.) Country comparison to the world: 6th
4.67 children born/woman (2018 est.) Country comparison to the world: 22nd

Median age
Total: 17 years. Country comparison to the world: 218th
Male: 16.4 years
Female: 17.6 years (2020 est.)

Total: 18.4 years. Country comparison to the world: 209th
Male: 18.1 years 
Female: 18.7 years (2018 est.)

Total: 18.2 years
Male: 17.9 years
Female: 18.6 years (2017 est.)

Population growth rate
3.34% (2022 est.) Country comparison to the world: 7th
2.68% (2018 est.) Country comparison to the world: 16th
2.71% (2017 est.)

Birth rate 
41.15 births/1,000 population (2022 est.) Country comparison to the world: 3rd
34.5 births/1,000 population (2018 est.) Country comparison to the world: 22nd
35 births/1,000 population (2017 est.)

Death rate 
8.01 deaths/1,000 population (2022 est.) Country comparison to the world: 89th
7.7 deaths/1,000 population (2018 est.) Country comparison to the world: 99th
7.9 deaths/1,000 population (2017 est.)

Net migration rate
0.24 migrant(s)/1,000 population (2022 est.) Country comparison to the world: 76th
0 migrant(s)/1,000 population (2017 est.) Country comparison to the world: 74th

Mother's mean age at first birth
20.5 years (2017/18 est.)
note: median age at first birth among women 25-49

20.3 years (2011/12 est.)
Note: median age at first birth among women 25-29

Contraceptive prevalence rate
17.9% (2014)

Urbanization
urban population: 49.5% of total population (2022)
rate of urbanization: 3.74% annual rate of change (2020-25 est.)

Urban population: 47.3% of total population (2018)
Rate of urbanization: 3.89% annual rate of change (2015-20 est.)

Sex ratio
At birth: 1.05 male(s)/female
Under 15 years: 1.04 male(s)/female
15-64 years: 0.99 male(s)/female
65 years and over: 0.70 male(s)/female
Total population: 1.0 male(s)/female (2009 est.)

Life expectancy at birth
total population: 62.21 years. Country comparison to the world: 213rd
male: 60.39 years
female: 64.14 years (2022 est.)

Total population: 62.7 years (2018 est.) Country comparison to the world: 198th
Male: 61.2 years (2018 est.)
Female: 64.2 years (2018 est.)

Total population: 62.3 years
Male: 60.9 years
Female: 63.8 years (2017 est.)

Contraceptive prevalence rate
15.5% (2017/18)

Children under the age of 5 years underweight 

18% (2014)

HIV/AIDS
Adult prevalence rate: 1% (2017 est.)
People living with HIV/AIDS: 70,000 (2017 est.)
Deaths: 2,500 (2017 est.)

Major infectious diseases
Degree of risk: very high
Food or waterborne diseases: bacterial and protozoal diarrhea, hepatitis A, and typhoid fever
Vectorborne diseases: malaria, yellow fever, and others are high risks in some locations
Respiratory disease: meningococcal meningitis
Animal contact disease: rabies (2009)

Nationality
English demonym and adjective:
Beninese (singular and plural)

French demonym and adjective:
Béninois (masculine, singular and plural)
Béninoise (feminine, singular)
Béninoises (feminine, plural)

Ethnic groups
Fon and related 39.2%, Adja and related 15.2%, Yoruba and related 12.3%, Bariba and related 9.2%, Fulani and related 7%, Ottamari and related 6.1%, Yoa-Lokpa and related 4%, Dendi and related 2.5%, Other 1.6%, Unspecified 2.9% (2002 est.)

Religions

Islam 27.7%, Roman Catholic 25.5%, Protestant 13.5% (Celestial 6.7%, Methodist 3.4%, other Protestant 3.4%), Vodoun 11.6%, other Christian 9.5%, other traditional religions 2.6%, Other 2.6%, None 5.8%, (2013 est.) 
Pew Forum estimated that, in 2010, that Roman Catholics constituted 30% of the country, Protestants 23.2%, and other Christians 0.3%, with all Christians making up 53.4% of the population.

Languages

Over 50 languages are spoken in Benin. The official language is French. Of the many indigenous African languages, Fon and Yoruba are the most important in southern Benin. In the north there are at least six major languages, including Baatonum and Fulani.

Literacy
Definition: age 15 and over can read and write
Total population: 38.4%
Male: 49.9%
Female: 27.3% (2015 est.)

Education expenditure
4.4% of total GDP
Country comparison to the world: 91

References

 and the 2003 U.S. Department of State website.

 
Society of Benin